Sudoeste Rio-Grandense (Southwest of Rio Grande) is one of the seven mesoregions of the state of Rio Grande do Sul in Brazil. It consists of 19 municipalities, grouped in three microregions:
 Campanha Central
 Campanha Meridional
 Campanha Ocidental

References

Mesoregions of Rio Grande do Sul